Reaser is a surname. Notable people with the surname include:

Elizabeth Reaser (born 1975), American actress
Keith Reaser (born 1991), American football player

Americanized surnames
Surnames of German origin